David Goffin was the defending champion, but he participated in Davis Cup instead this year.

Pablo Carreño Busta won the title, defeating Radu Albot in the final, 6–4, 6–4.

Seeds

Draw

Finals

Top half

Bottom half

External Links
 Main Draw
 Qualifying Draw

Poznan Open - Singles
2015 Singles